Hampstead Garden Suburb is an elevated suburb  of London, north of Hampstead, west of Highgate and east of Golders Green. It is known for its intellectual, liberal, artistic, musical and literary associations. It is an example of early twentieth-century domestic architecture and town planning in the London Borough of Barnet, northwest London.

The master plan was prepared by Barry Parker and Sir Raymond Unwin. Comprising just over 5,000 properties, and home to around 16,000 people, undivided houses with individual gardens are a key feature. The area enjoys landscaped garden squares, several communal parks and Hampstead Heath Extension.

History
Hampstead Garden Suburb was founded by Henrietta Barnett, who, with her husband Samuel, had started the Whitechapel Art Gallery and Toynbee Hall.  In 1906, Barnett set up the Hampstead Garden Suburb Trust Ltd, which purchased 243 acres of land from Eton College for the scheme and appointed Raymond Unwin as its architect.

Among the scheme's aims were the following:
 It should cater for all classes of people and all income groups
 There should be a low housing density
 Roads should be wide and tree-lined
 Houses should be separated by hedges, not walls
 Woods and public gardens should be free to all
 It should be quiet, with no church bells

This required a private bill before Parliament, as it was counter to local bylaws. The provisions of the new act, Hampstead Garden Suburb Act 1906, allowed less land to be taken up by roads and more by gardens and open spaces.

The ideas for the "Garden Suburb" were clearly based on the ideas and experience of Parker and Unwin in the planning and development of Letchworth Garden City, the first development of its kind, inspired by the work of Ebenezer Howard. Other consultant architects involved with the Hampstead development include George Lister Sutcliffe and John Soutar.

However, with no industry, no public houses and few shops or services, the suburb, unlike the garden cities, made no attempt to be self-contained. In the 1930s the "Suburb" (as it is known by locals) expanded to the north of the A1. While more characterful than most other suburban housing, some of the housing to the north is considered, overall, of less architectural value.

On Central Square, laid out by Sir Edwin Lutyens, there are two large churches, St. Jude's Church and The Free Church, as well as a Quaker Meeting House. There are two mixed state primary schools in the Suburb, Garden Suburb and Brookland. There is also a state girls' grammar school, Henrietta Barnett School. The school used to house The Institute, an adult education centre, but The Institute moved first to East Finchley, then to Kingsbury and is currently in the process of closing down altogether.

Shops and other services are provided in the shopping parade of Market Place. Shopping areas adjacent to the suburb include Temple Fortune, Golders Green and East Finchley.

Little Wood contains an open-air arena, which is used for summer theatrical performances by a local amateur theatre society.

Hampstead Garden Suburb Trust
Freehold houses, flats and commercial premises within the Suburb are subject to a scheme of management approved pursuant to the Leasehold Reform Act 1967 by an Order of the Chancery Division of the High Court, dated 17 January 1974, as amended by a further Order dated 17 February 1983.

The HGS Trust maintains the character and amenity of the Suburb and is responsible for implementing the management scheme. It has offices in Finchley Road. Freeholders are required to get the prior approval of the trust before altering the external appearance of their properties. Consent is also required for significant changes to gardens, erection of garden sheds and felling or pruning of trees. The trust is also the freeholder of the majority of the remaining leasehold properties in the Suburb which are mostly held on very long leases.

Hampstead Garden Suburb Act 1906
Urban town planning had been restricted by the byelaws established after the 1875 Housing Act, which had de facto called for a grid iron street layout, and a minimum housing density. This had prevented Cadbury building workers houses within a city, and caused Rowntree to build his housing in rural parishes. For Unwin to design a street structure that followed the contours, and built houses in cul-de-sacs a parliamentary act was needed. The Hampstead Garden Suburb Trust sponsored a private bill.

The three relevant sections of the Act were

 Section 2"There shall not be built in the Garden Suburb on the average throughout a greater proportion of houses to the acre than eight".
"On every road in the Garden Suburb (whatever the width of the said road) there shall be between any two houses standing on opposite sides of the road a space not less than fifty feet free of any buildings except walls, fences or gates."

 Section 3"With respect to any gardens, recreation grounds or open spaces provided by the Company for the common use of the inhabitants of any dwellings in the Garden Suburb the Company may make bye-laws for the regulation thereof...."

 Section 5"Any road not exceeding 500 feet in length constructed primarily for the purpose of giving access to a group of houses in the Garden Suburb and not designed for the purposes of through traffic (known as an accommodation road), may with the consent of the local authority be exempted from any operation of any bye-laws of the local authority relating to the width of new streets and footways."

Section 2, defined a low building density, and wide streets with gardens or verges where trees could be planted. Section 5 distinguished between through-roads and accommodation roads, residential cul-de-sacs under .  It recognised the difference between cul-de-sac roads of limited length and other roads, and allowed  the suspension of certain the operation of local planning bye-laws

Geography

Parks and nature reserves
The Suburb has large areas of open space, including Central Square; Hampstead Heath Extension; Northway Gardens; Lyttelton Playing Fields; and Big Wood and Little Wood.  The southern end is close to Golders Hill Park.

Politics
Hampstead Garden Suburb is represented by two Councillors on Barnet Council.

Hampstead Garden Suburb is in the parliamentary constituency of Finchley and Golders Green. Mike Freer of the Conservative Party has been the MP since 2010.

Notable residents

See also
The Bishops Avenue
Brentham Garden Suburb
Sutton Garden Suburb
Ebenezer Howard
Garden city movement
Garden real estate
List of people from Barnet

References

Further reading
Hampstead Garden Suburb Notable Residents and where they lived compiled by Dr Eva Jacobs. Published by Hampstead Garden Suburb Trust.

External links

Hampstead Garden Suburb website
Hampstead Garden Suburb Trust
Famous residents

Hampstead Garden Suburb
Areas of London
1906 establishments in England
Districts of the London Borough of Barnet
Garden suburbs
Hampstead
Places formerly in Middlesex
Planned communities in England
Works of Edwin Lutyens in England